A travel itinerary is a schedule of events relating to planned travel, generally including destinations to be visited at specified times and means of transportation to move between those destinations. For example, both the plan of a business trip and the route of a road trip, or the proposed outline of one, are travel itineraries.

The construction of a travel itinerary may be assisted by the use of travel literature, including travel journals and diaries, a guide book containing information for visitors or tourists about the destination, or a trip planner website dedicated to helping the users plan their trips. Typically a travel itinerary is prepared by a travel agent who assists one in conducting their travel for business or leisure. Most commonly a travel agent provides a list of pre-planned travel itineraries to a traveller, who can then pick one that they're most satisfied with. However, with the advent of the internet, online maps, navigation, online trip planners and easier access to travel information in general, travellers, especially the younger ones prefer a more do-it-yourself approach to travel planning.

Since a travel itinerary might serve different purposes for different kinds of travellers, it is crucial for a travel agent to know all the characteristics of her/his target of customers. A typical business traveller's itinerary might include information about meetings, events and contacts with some time for leisure travel, efficiently.

Making of reservations
When a proposed itinerary has been finalised, the details need to be entered into an airline reservation system, where the appropriate reservations and bookings are made. In the industry, the travel plan is commonly known as the itinerary and the data on the reservation system is known as a passenger name record (PNR).

See also
 Travel plan, a package of actions designed by an organisation to encourage safe, healthy and sustainable travel options

References

External links
 One Day Itinerary Collection of travel itineraries from around the world
 Karambol Travel Itinerary Travel itinerary generated automatically by country
 Eat Move Make Food Fitness Travel Lifestyle

Travel